The Sukuma Museum is a community-based museum located in Mwanza, Tanzania. It was designed in 1968, and is dedicated to the preservation and display of artifacts related to the Sukuma culture.

See also 
 List of museums in Tanzania

References

External links
Official website

Museums in Tanzania
Mwanza
Buildings and structures in the Mwanza Region
Tourist attractions in the Mwanza Region